Spain participated in the Eurovision Song Contest 2007 with the song "I Love You Mi Vida" written by Thomas G:son, Andreas Rickstrand, Tony Sánchez-Ohlsson, Rebeca Pous Del Toro. The song was performed by the group D'Nash. The Spanish broadcaster Televisión Española (TVE) organised the national final Misión Eurovisión 2007 in order to select the Spanish entry for the 2007 contest in Helsinki, Finland. The national final consisted of four heats, a semi-final and a final and involved 57 competing acts. Five acts and five songs ultimately qualified to compete in the televised final where a public televote first selected the top five to advance to the second round. In the second round of voting, a regional televote exclusively selected "I Love You Mi Vida" performed by Nash as the winner. The group was later renamed as D'Nash for the Eurovision Song Contest.

As a member of the "Big Four", Spain automatically qualified to compete in the final of the Eurovision Song Contest. Performing in position 2, Spain placed twentieth out of the 24 participating countries with 43 points.

Background 

Prior to the 2007 contest, Spain had participated in the Eurovision Song Contest forty-six times since its first entry in 1961. The nation has won the contest on two occasions: in 1968 with the song "La, la, la" performed by Massiel and in 1969 with the song "Vivo cantando" performed by Salomé, the latter having won in a four-way tie with France, the Netherlands and the United Kingdom. Spain has also finished second four times, with Karina in 1971, Mocedades in 1973, Betty Missiego in 1979 and Anabel Conde in 1995. In 2006, Spain placed twenty-first with the song "Bloody Mary" performed by Las Ketchup.

The Spanish national broadcaster, Televisión Española (TVE), broadcasts the event within Spain and organises the selection process for the nation's entry. TVE confirmed their intentions to participate at the 2007 Eurovision Song Contest on 20 October 2006. In 2006, TVE selected both the artist and song that would compete at the Eurovision Song Contest via an internal selection. For their 2007 entry, the broadcaster announced on 2 November 2007 that it would organise a national final featuring a competition among several artists and songs.

Before Eurovision

Misión Eurovisión 2007 
Misión Eurovisión 2007 was the national final organised by TVE that took place at Prado del Rey in Pozuelo de Alarcón, Madrid, hosted by Paula Vázquez. The national final consisted of six shows which commenced on 9 January 2007 and concluded with a winning song and artist during the final on 24 February 2007. All shows were broadcast on La 1 and TVE Internacional.

Format 
Fifty-seven artists competed in Misión Eurovisión 2007 which consisted of six shows: four heats on 9 January 2007, 16 January 2007, 23 January 2007 and 3 February 2007, a semi-final on 10 February 2007, and the final on 24 February 2007. The heats each featured fifteen artists (twelve in the fourth heat), while the semi-final featured the twenty qualifiers from the heats. Each artist performed original songs or cover versions of songs of their choice during the shows and five qualified from each show. The fourth heat featured an additional four acts which were duets consisting of eight of the artists that competed in the first three heats. The winning duet qualified for the semi-final. In the final, each of the remaining five artists performed five candidate Eurovision songs, selected through an Internet round, with the winner being decided upon over two rounds of voting. In the first round, the top five combinations of artist and song qualified for a second round of voting, during which the winning entry was determined.

The results during the heats and the semi-final shows were decided upon through public televoting and an in-studio expert jury. In the heats and the semi-final, the contestants first faced a regional televote where the top three qualified. The jury then selected an additional two artists (one in the fourth heat) from the remaining artists to advance. For the duet selection, the results were decided upon through public televoting. In the final, the first round results were decided upon through public televoting, while regional televoting exclusively determined the second round results. For the regional televote, the votes of each of the nineteen autonomous communities of Spain created an overall ranking from which a set of points was distributed. A twentieth set of points was based on the votes submitted via mobile phones. The two members of the in-studio jury that evaluated the contestants during the shows were former Eurovision contestants Massiel who represented Spain and won in 1968, and Mikel Herzog who represented Spain in 1998.

Competing entries 
Two separate submission periods were open on 14 November 2006 for artists and songwriters to submit their applications and songs. TVE sought out mid-uptempo songs that contained lyrics in a bilingual mix of English and Spanish as well as onomatopoeias and refrains with syllables that contain no meaning but easy to remember. The deadline for songwriters concluded on 30 December 2006, while the deadline for artists concluded on 15 January 2007. At the conclusion of the submission period, 1,001 songs and 680 artist applications were received. Fifteen songs were selected for an Internet vote from those received, while performer auditions in front of the two in-studio jury members took place in Madrid and Seville.

The forty-five competing acts were announced on 8 January 2007 during a press conference, while the selected songs were announced on 11 January 2007. Among the competing artists were former Eurovision Song Contest entrants Amaya Saizar, who represented Spain in the Eurovision Song Contest 1984 as part of the group Bravo, and La Década Prodigiosa, which represented Spain in the Eurovision Song Contest 1988. An additional 12 artists were later selected following further auditions, which were announced on 30 January 2007.

Shows

Heat 1 
The first heat took place on 9 January 2007. The fifteen contestants first faced a regional televote where Miguel Cañadas, Santa Fe and Nessa qualified for the semi-final. An additional two qualifiers, Póker and Gerard, were selected from the remaining twelve contestants by an in-studio jury.

Heat 2 
The second heat took place on 16 January 2007. The fifteen contestants first faced a regional televote where Nazaret, Montse Mallorquín and Mirela qualified for the semi-final. An additional two qualifiers, Paraelissa and Paco Arrojo, were selected from the remaining twelve contestants by an in-studio jury.

Heat 3 
The third heat took place on 23 January 2007. The fifteen contestants first faced a regional televote where Yanira Figueroa, Nash and Marta Llenas qualified for the semi-final. An additional two qualifiers, Sheila Rodríguez and Rebeca, were selected from the remaining twelve contestants by an in-studio jury.

Heat 4 
The fourth heat took place on 3 February 2007. The twelve contestants first faced a regional televote where Merche Llobera, Míriam Roca and Fran qualified for the semi-final. An additional qualifier, Luis Amando, was selected from the remaining nine contestants by an in-studio jury. For the duet, Mirela and Gerard was selected exclusively by a public televote to compete in the semi-final. In addition to the performances of the contestants, guests performers included former Eurovision contestant Dana International who won the Eurovision Song Contest 1998 for Israel, and Eurovision contestant Dmitri Koldun who would represent Belarus in 2007.

Semi-final 
The semi-final took place on 10 February 2007. The twenty contestants first faced a regional televote where Nash, Merche Llobera and Yanira Figueroa qualified for the semi-final. An additional two qualifiers, Nazaret and Mirela, were selected from the remaining seventeen contestants by an in-studio jury.

Internet vote 
Internet users had between 15 and 21 January 2007 to vote for their favourite songs via the Misión Eurovisión website and on 24 January 2007, the top five entries qualified for the second round and a committee evaluated the remaining entries and selected an additional five songs for the second round. A committee evaluated the remaining entries and selected an additional five songs for the second round. In the second round, users had until 28 January 2007 to vote for their favourite songs and on 29 January 2007, the top three entries qualified for the national final and an additional two songs were selected from the remaining five songs by the committee.

Final 
The final took place on 24 February 2007. The winner was selected over two rounds of voting. In the first round, each of the finalists performed abridged versions of the five candidate Eurovision songs and a public televote exclusively selected the top five combinations of artist and song to advance to the second round, the superfinal. In the superfinal, the winner, "I Love You Mi Vida" performed by Nash, was selected exclusively by regional televoting.

Ratings

Preparation 
The official video of the song was filmed in March 2007 at the Estudios Buñuel in Madrid. The final version of the song, produced by Mar de Pablos and Carlos Quintero, premiered on 7 March 2007 with the video later released on 9 March 2007 on RTVE's website. The music video served as the official preview video for the Spanish entry. On 21 March 2007, it was announced that Nash would perform at the Eurovision Song Contest under the name D'Nash due to issues with registering their initial stage name.

At Eurovision
According to Eurovision rules, all nations with the exceptions of the host country, the "Big Four" (France, Germany, Spain and the United Kingdom) and the ten highest placed finishers in the 2006 contest are required to qualify from the semi-final in order to compete for the final; the top ten countries from the semi-final progress to the final. As a member of the "Big 4", Spain automatically qualified to compete in the final on 12 May 2007. In addition to their participation in the final, Spain is also required to broadcast and vote in the semi-final on 10 May 2007.

In Spain, both the semi-final and the final were broadcast on La 1 with commentary by Beatriz Pécker. The Spanish spokesperson, who announced the Spanish votes during the final, was Ainhoa Arbizu. The broadcast of the final was watched by 3.373 million viewers in Spain with a market share of 28%. This represented a decrease of 10.9% from the previous year with 1.339 million less viewers.

Final 

D'Nash took part in technical rehearsals on 7 and 8 May, followed by dress rehearsals on 11 and 12 May. During the running order draw for the semi-final and final on 12 March 2007, Spain was placed to perform in position 2 in the final, following the entry from Bosnia and Herzegovina.

The Spanish performance featured the members of D'Nash on stage dressed in white outfits and doing a dance routine, joined by two backing vocalists on silver kettle drums. The LED screens displayed a digital mosaic background which transitioned between blue and red colours, with the latter covered by the title of the song "I Love U Mi Vida". During the performance, D'Nash interpreted the song title in sign language in order for people who can't hear to understand the message of their song, as explained by the group members. The performance also featured pyrotechnic effects which included industrial sparks and flaming columns. The five backing vocalists that joined D'Nash were Noemí Calumarte and Rebeca Rods. Spain placed twentieth in the final, scoring 43 points.

Voting 
Below is a breakdown of points awarded to Spain and awarded by Spain in the semi-final and grand final of the contest. The nation awarded its 12 points to Andorra in the semi-final and to Romania in the final of the contest.

Points awarded to Spain

Points awarded by Spain

References

2007
Countries in the Eurovision Song Contest 2007
Eurovision
Eurovision